This article lists important figures and events in the public affairs of British Malaya during the year 1931, together with births and deaths of prominent Malayans.

Incumbent political figures

Central level 
 Governor of Federated of Malay States :
 Cecil Clementi
 Chief Secretaries to the Government of the FMS :
 Charles Walter Hamilton Cochrane 
 Governor of Straits Settlements :
 Cecil Clementi

State level 
  Perlis :
 Raja of Perlis : Syed Alwi Syed Saffi Jamalullail
  Johore :
 Sultan of Johor : Sultan Ibrahim Al-Masyhur
  Kedah :
 Sultan of Kedah : Abdul Hamid Halim Shah
  Kelantan :
 Sultan of Kelantan : Sultan Ismail Sultan Muhammad IV
  Trengganu :
 Sultan of Trengganu : Sulaiman Badrul Alam Shah
  Selangor :
 British Residents of Selangor : James Lornie 
 Sultan of Selangor : Sultan Sir Alaeddin Sulaiman Shah
  Penang :
 Monarchs : King George V
 Residents-Councillors :
 Edward Wilmot Francis Gilman (until unknown date) 
 Percy Tothill Allen (from unknown date) 
  Malacca :
 Monarchs : King George V
 Residents-Councillors :
  Negri Sembilan :
 British Residents of Negri Sembilan : James William Simmons
 Yang di-Pertuan Besar of Negri Sembilan : Tuanku Muhammad Shah ibni Almarhum Tuanku Antah 
   Pahang :
 British Residents of Pahang : Hugh Goodwin Russell Leonard
 Sultan of Pahang : Sultan Abdullah al-Mu'tassim Billah 
  Perak :
 British Residents of Perak : Bertram Walter Elles 
 Sultan of Perak : Sultan Iskandar Shah

Events 
 2 February – St. Anthony's School, Teluk Intan was founded by Rev. Fr. Michel Bonamy.
 Unknown date – Construction began on Masjid Alwi, Perlis.

Births 
 10 January – Nik Abdul Aziz bin Nik Mat _ Politician and Muslim cleric (died 2015)
 2 August – Sha'ari Tadin, politician (d. 2009) 
 24 October – Suhailah Mohamed Noah – Wife to former 3rd Prime Minister, Hussein Onn (died 2014)
 Unknown date – Abdullah bin Mohamed – Philosopher
 Unknown date – Shafiee Jaafar – Actor (died 2016)
 Unknown date – Syed Muhammad Naquib al-Attas – Philosopher
 Unknown date – Umi Kalthum – Actress (died 2013)

Deaths

See also 
 1931
 1930 in Malaya
 1932 in Malaya
 History of Malaysia

References 

1930s in British Malaya
Malaya
1931 in British Malaya
Malaysia
Years of the 20th century in British Malaya